Erhardt v. Boaro, 113 U.S. 537 (1885), was a suit instituted in equity ancillary to a principal action brought for the possession of a mining claim (Erhardt v. Boaro, 113 U.S. 527 (1885)). The object of the suit was to restrain the commission of waste by the defendants pending the outcome of the main action.

It was formerly the doctrine of equity in cases of alleged trespass on land not to restrain the use and enjoyment of the premises by the defendant when the title was in dispute, but to leave the complaining party to his remedy at law. A controversy as to the title was deemed sufficient to exclude the jurisdiction of the court. In Pillsworth v. Hopton, 6 Ves. 51, which was before Lord Eldon in 1801, he is reported to have said that he remembered being told in early life from the bench "that if the plaintiff filed a bill for an account and an injunction to restrain waste, stating that the defendant claimed by a title adverse to his, he stated himself out of court as to the injunction."

It is common practice in cases where irremediable mischief is being done or threatened going to the destruction of the substance of the estate, such as the extracting of ores from a mine or the cutting down of timber or the removal of coal, to issue an injunction though the title to the premises be in litigation. The authority of the court is exercised in such cases, through its preventive writ, to preserve the property from destruction pending legal proceedings for the determination of the title. Jerome v. Ross, 7 Johns. Ch. 315, 332; Le Roy v. Wright, 4 Sawyer 530, 535.

See also
List of United States Supreme Court cases, volume 113

References

External links
 

1885 in United States case law
Dolores County, Colorado
Legal history of Colorado
United States Supreme Court cases
United States Supreme Court cases of the Waite Court